{{Automatic taxobox
|image = Spirotropis azorica (MNHN-IM-2000-2751).jpeg
|image_caption = Shell of  Spirotropis azorica (holotype at MNHN, Paris)
|taxon = Spirotropis (gastropod)
|authority = Sars, 1878 
|synonyms_ref = 
|synonyms= Pleurotoma (Spirotropis) G. O. Sars, 1878 
|type_species = †Pleurotoma carinata
|type_species_authority = Bivona, 1838
|subdivision_ranks = Species
|subdivision = See text
|display_parents = 3
}}Spirotropis  is a genus of sea snails, marine gastropod mollusks in the family Drilliidae.

Species
Species within the genus Spirotropis  include:
 Spirotropis agamedea (Dall, W.H., 1919) 
 Spirotropis aganactica (Watson, 1886)
 Spirotropis azorica Bouchet & Warén, 1980
 † Spirotropis badensis R. Janssen, 1993 
 † Spirotropis bainbridgensis Durham, 1944
 † Spirotropis calodius Moore, 1963
 † Spirotropis campi Durham, 1944
 † Spirotropis carinata (Bivona, 1838) (synonym of Spirotropis monterosatoi (É.A.A. Locard, 1897))
 Spirotropis centimata (Dall, 1889)
 † Spirotropis claibornica Garvie, 1996 
 Spirotropis confusa (Seguenza, 1880)
 Spirotropis cymothoe (W.H. Dall, 1919)
 Spirotropis ephamilla Verrill, 1884
 Spirotropis eurytima Morassi, 1998
 Spirotropis genilda (Dall, 1908)
 † Spirotropis gramensis R. Janssen, 1993
 Spirotropis guancha Ortega & Gofas, 2019
 † Spirotropis karamanensis R. Janssen, 1993 
 Spirotropis laodice (Dall, 1919)
 Spirotropis limula Martens, 1904
 Spirotropis lithocolleta (Watson, 1881)
  † Spirotropis modiolus (de Cristofori & Jan, 1832)
 Spirotropis monterosatoi (Locard, 1897)
 Spirotropis phaeacra (Watson, 1881)
 † Spirotropis spinescens (Bellardi, 1847) 
 Spirotropis stirophora (Watson, 1881)
 Spirotropis studeriana (Martens, 1878)
 Spirotropis tmeta (Watson, 1881)
†Spirotropis tortonica R. Janssen, 1993 
Species brought into synonymy
  Spirotropis acutus L.M.D. Bellardi in E. Sismonda, 1842: synonym of Spirotropis modiolus (G.J. De Cristofori & G. Jan, 1832)
 Spirotropis azoricus Bouchet & Warén, 1980: synonym of Spirotropis azorica Bouchet & Warén, 1980
 Spirotropis bulbacea R.B. Watson, 1881 synonym of Aoteadrillia bulbacea (R.B. Watson, 1881)
 Spirotropis centimatus (Dall, 1889): synonym of Spirotropis centimata (Dall, 1889)
 Spirotropis clytotropis Sykes, 1906: synonym of Ancistrosyrinx clytotropis (Sykes, 1906)
 Spirotropis leucopyrga W. Kobelt, 1904: synonym of Spirotropis centimata (W.H. Dall, 1889)
 Spirotropis megalacme Sykes, 1906: synonym of Drilliola megalacme (Sykes, 1906)
 Spirotropis melvilli Sykes, 1906: synonym of Micropleurotoma melvilli (Sykes, 1906)
 Spirotropis meta R.B. Watson, 1881: synonym of Spirotropis tmeta (R.B. Watson, 1881)
 Spirotropis patagonica (d'Orbigny, 1841): synonym of Bela patagonica (d'Orbigny, 1841) (superseded combination)
 Spirotropis remota Powell, 1958: synonym of Micropleurotoma remota (Powell, 1958)
 Spirotropis sarsi Warén, 1975: synonym of Spirotropis confusa (Seguenza, 1880)
 Spirotropis scalaris P. Partsch in J. Von Hauer, 1837:synonym of Spirotropis modiolus (G.J. De Cristofori & G. Jan, 1832)
 † Spirotropis spinescens Bernasconi & Robba, 1985 (partim); synonym of  † Spirotropis badensis R. Janssen, 1993
 Spirotropis turrisulcata É.A.A. Locard, 1897: synonym of Theta chariessa (R.B. Watson, 1881)

References

 Bernasconi, M. P., and E. Robba. "The Miocene species of the genus Spirotropis (Turridae, Gastropoda) in Europe." Boll. Mus. reg. Sci. nat. Torino 3.1 (1985): 203–220.
 Gofas, S.; Le Renard, J.; Bouchet, P. (2001). Mollusca, in: Costello, M.J. et al. (Ed.) (2001). European register of marine species: a check-list of the marine species in Europe and a bibliography of guides to their identification''. Collection Patrimoines Naturels, 50: pp. 180–213 
 Tucker, J.K. 2004 Catalog of recent and fossil turrids (Mollusca: Gastropoda). Zootaxa 682:1-1295

External links
 Janssen, R. 1993. Taxonomy, evolution and spreading of the turrid genus Spirotropis (Gastropoda: Turridae). Scripta Geologica Special Issue 2:237-261, 2 figs., 5 pls.

 
Gastropod genera